The Gladiator is a 2009 novel by Simon Scarrow and the ninth book in the Eagle series, where we see the return of Macro and Cato, this time up against a ruthless gladiator in the Island of Crete after their ship is damaged by a tidal wave on their way to Rome

2009 British novels
Eagles of the Empire
Novels set in ancient Greece
Gladiatorial combat in fiction